The mountainous dwarf skink (Scincella monticola)  is a species of skink found in China and Vietnam.

References

Scincella
Reptiles described in 1925
Taxa named by Karl Patterson Schmidt